Dajing may refer to:

 Dajing, Zhejiang (大荆镇), a town in Yueqing, Zhejiang Province, China
 Dajing, Miluo (大荆镇), a town in Miluo City, Hunan province
 Dajing River, China
 Dajing Station, Beijing, China
 Dajing, Guangdong Province, China